Sonkatch is a town and a Nagar panchayat in Dewas district in the Indian state of Madhya Pradesh.

Demographics
At the 2001 India census, Sonkatch had a population of 15,543. Males constituted 51% of the population and females 49%. Sonkatch had an average literacy rate of 69%, higher than the national average of 59.5%: male literacy was 77%, and female literacy was 61%. In Sonkatch, 15% of the population were under 6 years of age.

Sonkatch is located on the bank of the Kali Sindh river on the NH-86 Indore - Bhopal road. It is 70 km from Indore, 33 km from Dewas, 70 km from Ujjain and 118 km from Bhopal. Dewas is the nearest Railway station.

Temple
The temple here is dedicated to Lord Mahavir. This Jain kshetra is a 250 acre complex housing Jain Sthanaks, school, hospital, museum, cottages, shopping centers and above all, a 108 fool tall idol of Bhagwan Paraswanath in a yogic (padmasan) posture. This would be one of tallest Jain idols surpassing even 57' height Bhagwan Bahubali idol at Shravanabelgola in Karnataka.

References

Cities and towns in Dewas district